Amphritea spongicola is a Gram-negative and rod-shaped bacterium from the genus of Amphritea which has been isolated from a marine sponge from Micronesia.

References

Oceanospirillales
Bacteria described in 2015